Not Not While the Giro is a collection of short stories by the Scottish writer James Kelman first published in 1983.

References

Scottish short story collections
Short story collections by James Kelman
1983 short story collections
Polygon Books books